Esk or ESK may refer to:

Places 
 Esk, Queensland, Australia
 Esk Island, in the Great Palm Island group, Queensland, Australia
 River Esk (disambiguation), also Esk River
 Shire of Esk, a former local government area in Queensland, Australia
 Esk Island, one of the Whitsunday Islands, Queensland, Australia
 Upper Esk, Tasmania, a locality in Australia

Other uses 
 , several ships
 Mungo ESK, a German Army air-transportable armoured transport vehicle
 Economics of scientific knowledge
 Elbe Lateral Canal, in Germany
 Europa-Schule Kairo, a German international school in New Cairo, Egypt
 Esk Highway, Tasmania, Australia
 ESK, IATA code fro Eskişehir Airport, Turkey
 esk, ISO 639-3 code for the Northwest Alaska Inupiatun language, spoken in Alaska and the Northwest Territories
 ESK, ICAO airline designator for SkyEurope, a defunct Slovakian airline
 Esk, a character of Terry Pratchett's novel Equal Rites

See also
North Esk (disambiguation)
South Esk (disambiguation)